John Rous (c. 1618 – 2 November 1680) was an English politician who sat in the House of Commons in 1660.

Rous was the son of John Rous of Rous Lench, Worcestershire and his wife Esther Temple, daughter of Sir Thomas Temple, 1st Baronet of Burton Dassett, Warwickshire. He was a student of Lincoln's Inn in 1636. He was a J.P. and commissioner for assessment for Warwickshire from 1649 to 1652. He was commissioner for assessment for  Coventry from 1650 to 1652.  He was re-instated as JP for Warwickshire in 1653 and remained to his death. In 1657 he was commissioner for assessment for Warwickshire and for Coventry. He was a commissioner for  militia for Warwickshire in March 1660.

In 1660, Rous was elected Member of Parliament for Warwick in the Convention Parliament. He was commissioner for assessment for Warwickshire from August 1660 and for Warwick from September 1660 until his death.. From 1675 to 1676, he was Sheriff of Warwickshire. 
 
Rous died at the age of about 62, and was buried at Bishop’s Tachbrooke.

Rous married Mary Wagstaffe, widow of Thomas Wagstaffe of Tachbrooke Mallory and daughter of John Combe of The College, Stratford-on-Avon, Warwickshire. He was the brother of Sir Thomas Rous, 1st Baronet.

References

1610s births
1680 deaths
English MPs 1660
Members of Lincoln's Inn
High Sheriffs of Warwickshire
Sheriffs of Warwickshire